This is a list of works and appearances by the English playwright, actor, singer and songwriter Noël Coward.

Stage works

Stage appearances
London, except where stated otherwise
{| class="wikitable plainrowheaders" style="text-align: left; margin-right: 0;"

! scope="col" |Year
! scope="col" |Role
! scope="col" |Venue

|-
| 1911
| Prince Mussel in The Goldfish by Lila Field
| Little, Royal Court Theatre, Crystal Palace
|-
|
| Cannard in The Great Name by Charles Hawtrey
| Prince of Wales
|-
|
| William in Where the Rainbow Ends by Clifford Mills and John Ramsey
| Savoy
|-
| 1912
| Mushroom in An Autumn Idyll by Ruby Ginner
| Savoy
|-
|
| The Boy in A Little Fowl Play, by Harold Owen
| London Coliseum
|-
|
| William in Where the Rainbow Ends
| Garrick
|-
| 1913
| An Angel in Hannele by Gerhart Hauptmann
| Liverpool Playhouse and Gaiety, Manchester
|-
|
| Tommy in War in the Air by Frank Dupree
| London Palladium
|-
|
| Understudy for Reginald Sheffield as Buster in Never Say Die by W. H. Post
| Apollo
|-
|
| Charity matinee of A Little Fowl Play
| London Opera House
|-
|
| Slightly in Peter Pan, by J. M. Barrie
| Duke of York's
|-
| 1914
| Toured as Slightly in Peter Pan
|
|-
| 1915
| Slightly in Peter Pan
| Duke of York's
|-
|
| The Slacker in Where the Rainbow Ends
| Garrick
|-
| 1916
| Charles Wykeham in Charley's Aunt by Brandon Thomas
| tour
|-
|
| Basil Pyecroft in The Light Blues, by Mark Ambient and Jack Hulbert (and understudy to Hulbert)
| Shaftesbury
|-
|
| Professional dancer with Eileen Denis at the Elysée restaurant
|
|-
|
| Jack Morrison in The Happy Family, by Cecil Aldin and Adrian Ross
| Prince of Wales
|-
| 1917
| Leicester Boyd in Wild Heather, by Dorothy Brandon
| Gaiety, Manchester
|-
|
| Ripley Guildford in The Saving Grace, by Haddon Chambers
| Garrick
|-
| 1918
| Courtney Bourner in Scandal by Cosmond Harrison
| Strand
|-
| 1919
| Ralph in The Knight of the Burning Pestle, by Francis Beaumont
| Birmingham Repertory
|-
| 1920
| Bobbie Dermott in his own play, I'll Leave It to You
| Gaiety Manchester and New
|-
|
| Ralph in The Knight of the Burning Pestle
| Kingsway
|-
| 1921
| Clay Collins in Polly with a Past, by George Middleton and Guy Bolton
| St James's
|-
| 1922
| Sholto Brent in his own play, The Young Idea
| Prince's Theatre, Bristol, and tour
|-
| 1923
| Sholto Brent
| Savoy
|-
|
| Appeared in London Calling! (of which he was co-author)
| Duke of York's
|-
| 1924
| Nicky Lancaster in his own play, The Vortex
| Everyman Hampstead and Royalty
|-
| 1925
| Nicky Lancaster
| Comedy, Little, Henry Miller's, New York
|-
| 1926
| Lewis Dodd in The Constant Nymph , by Margaret Kennedy and Basil Dean
| New
|-
| 1928
| Clark Storey in The Second Man, by S. N. Behrman
| Playhouse Theatre
|-
|
| Appeared in his own revue, This Year of Grace
| Baltimore, and Selwyn Theatre, New York
|-
| 1930
| Captain Stanhope in Journey's End, by R. C. Sherriff
| Victoria. Singapore
|-
|
| Elyot Chase in his own play Private Lives
| Tour and Phoenix.
|-
|
| Fred in his own sketch Some Other Private Lives (charity matinee)
| Hippodrome
|-
| 1931
| Elyot Chase in Private Lives
| Times Square, New York
|-
| 1933
| Leo in his own play, Design for Living
| Hanna Cleveland and Ethel Barrymore, New York
|-
| 1934
| Paul, Duc de Chaucigny-Varennes, in his own operetta, Conversation Piece
| His Majesty's
|-
| 1935
| Pre-London tour in his own one-act plays, Tonight at 8.30
|
|-
| 1936
| Appeared in the ten plays of Tonight at 8.30
| Phoenix
|-
|
| Appeared in the same plays (with the exception of Star Chamber)
| National, New York
|-
| 1942
| Charles Condomine in his own play, Blithe Spirit.
| St James's
|-
|
| Toured in "Noël Coward's Play Parade" as Charles Condomine and as Garry Essendine and Frank Gibbons in his own plays, Present Laughter and This Happy Breed|
|-
| 1943
| Garry Essendine in Present Laughter  and Frank Gibbons in This Happy Breed| Haymarket
|-
| 1945
| Two performances in his own revue, Sigh No More.
| Piccadilly
|-
| 1947
| Garry Essendine in revival of Present Laughter| Haymarket
|-
| 1948
| Three performances in Tonight at 8.30 (Hands Across the Sea, Shadow Play and Fumed Oak) during US tour.
|
|-
|
| Appeared as Max Aramont in Joyeux Chagrins, the French translation of his Present Laughter| Théâtre Édouard VII, Paris
|-
| 1951
| Concert, performing his own songs as try-out for London season (below)
| Theatre Royal, Brighton
|-
|
| Solo cabaret season (October)
| Café de Paris
|-
| 1952
| Two cabaret performances with Mary Martin in aid of the Actors' Orphanage (January and November)
| Café de Paris
|-
|
| Second solo cabaret season (June)
| Café de Paris
|-
| 1953
| King Magnus in The Apple Cart, by Bernard Shaw
| Haymarket
|-
|
| Third London solo cabaret season
| Café de Paris
|-
|
| Appeared in Stars at Midnight, one-off performance in aid of the Actors' Orphanage
| Palladium
|-
| 1954
| Introduced Marlene Dietrich's cabaret act
| Café de Paris
|-
|
| Appeared in Night of 100 Stars, in aid of the Actors' Orphanage
| Palladium
|-
|
| Fourth and final London solo cabaret season
| Café de Paris
|-
|
| Appeared at the Royal Variety Performance
| Palladium
|-
| 1955
| Solo cabaret season at the Desert Inn, Las Vegas
|
|-
| 1956
| Narrated Ogden Nash's verses for Carnival of the Animals| Carnegie Hall, New York
|-
| 1957
| Sebastien in his own Nude with Violin| Tour and Belasco Theatre New York and second tour
|-
| 1958
| Garry Essendine in Present Laughter| Belasco Theatre and tour
|-
|
| Appeared in Night of 100 Stars, in aid of the Actors' Orphanage
| Palladium
|-
|
| Appeared in gala cabaret in Nice
|
|-
| 1966
| Appeared in his own Suite in Three Keys as Sir Hugo Latymer (A Song at Twilight), George Hilgay (Shadows of the Evening) and Verner Conklin (Come Into the Garden, Maud)
| Queen's
|}
Source: Mander and Mitchenson.

 Songs 

Coward wrote more than three hundred songs. The Noël Coward Society's website, drawing on performing statistics from the publishers and the Performing Rights Society, names "Mad About the Boy" (from Words and Music) as Coward's most popular song, followed, in order, by:

 "I'll See You Again" (Bitter Sweet)
 "Mad Dogs and Englishmen" (Words and Music)
 "If Love Were All" (Bitter Sweet)
 "Someday I'll Find You" (Private Lives)
 "I'll Follow My Secret Heart" (Conversation Piece)
 "London Pride" (1941)
 "A Room With a View" (This Year of Grace)
 "Mrs Worthington" (1934)
 "Poor Little Rich Girl" (On with the Dance)
 "The Stately Homes of England" (Operette)

In the society's second tier of favourites are:

 "The Party's Over Now" (Words and Music)
 "Dearest Love" (Operette)
 "Dear Little Café" (Bitter Sweet)
 "Parisian Pierrot" (London Calling!)
 "Men About Town" (Tonight at 8.30)
 "Twentieth Century Blues" (Cavalcade)
 "Uncle Harry" (Pacific 1860)
 "Don't Let's Be Beastly to the Germans" (1943)
 "There Are Bad Times Just Around the Corner" (Globe Review)
 "Dance, Little Lady" (This Year of Grace)
 "Has Anybody Seen Our Ship?" (Tonight at 8.30)
 "I Went to a Marvellous Party" (Set to Music)
 "Nina" (Sigh No More)
 "A Bar on the Piccola Marina" (1954)
 "Why Must the Show Go On?" (Together With Music)
 "Sail Away" (Ace of Clubs and Sail Away)
 "Zigeuner" (Bitter Sweet)

 Cinema 

Adaptations and original filmsThe Queen Was in the Parlour, directed by Graham Cutts (UK, 1927, based on the play of the same name)Easy Virtue, directed by Alfred Hitchcock (UK, 1928, based on the play of the same name)The Vortex, directed by Adrian Brunel (UK, 1928, based on the play of the same name)Private Lives, directed by Sidney Franklin, Metro-Goldwyn-Mayer (1931, based on the play of the same name)
 Tonight Is Ours, directed by Stuart Walker, Paramount (1933, based on the play The Queen Was in the Parlour)Cavalcade, directed by Frank Lloyd, 20th Century Fox (1933, based on the play of the same name)Bitter Sweet, directed by Herbert Wilcox (UK, 1933, based on the operetta of the same name)Design for Living, directed by Ernst Lubitsch, Paramount (1933, based on the play of the same name)Les amants terribles (The Terrible Lovers), directed by Marc Allégret (France, 1936, based on the play Private Lives)Bitter Sweet, directed by W. S. Van Dyke, Metro-Goldwyn-Mayer (1940, based on the operetta of the same name)In Which We Serve, original film, directed by Coward and David Lean, British Lion (1942). Screenplay by Coward.We Were Dancing, directed by Robert Z. Leonard, Metro-Goldwyn-Mayer (1942, based on the plays We Were Dancing, Ways and Means and Private Lives)This Happy Breed, directed by David Lean, Universal (UK, 1944, based on the play of the same name) (Coward was also a producer)Blithe Spirit, directed by David Lean (UK, 1945, based on the play of the same name) (Coward was also a producer)Brief Encounter, directed by David Lean (UK, 1945, based on the play Still Life) (Coward was also a screenwriter and producer)The Astonished Heart, directed by Terence Fisher (UK, 1950, based on the play of the same name) (Coward was also a screenwriter)Meet Me Tonight, directed by Anthony Pelissier (UK, 1952, based on the plays Ways and Means, Red Peppers, and Fumed Oak)Pretty Polly, directed by Guy Green (UK, 1967, based on the short story Pretty Polly Barlow)Brief Encounter, directed by Alan Bridges (UK, 1974, based on the play Still Life)
 Relative Values, directed by Eric Styles (UK, 2000, based on the play of the same name)Easy Virtue, directed by Stephan Elliott (UK, 2008, based on the play of the same name)

ActorHearts of the World (1918) (uncredited)The Scoundrel (1935) as Anthony MallareMen Are Not Gods (1936) (uncredited)In Which We Serve (1942) as Captain E.V. Kinross (also a screenwriter, producer and co-director)Blithe Spirit (1945) (uncredited narrator) (also producer)Brief Encounter (1945) (uncredited narrator) (also a screenwriter and co-producer)The Astonished Heart (1950) as Dr. Christian FaberBlithe Spirit (1956 TV film) as Charles CondomineAround the World in 80 Days (1956) as Roland Hesketh-BaggottOur Man in Havana (1959) as HawthorneSurprise Package (1960) as King Pavel IIParis When It Sizzles (1964) as Alexander MeyerheimNinety Years On (1964 TV film) as Narrator / HostBunny Lake Is Missing (1965) as Horatio WilsonAndrocles and the Lion (1967 TV film) as CaesarBoom! (1968) as The Witch of CapriThe Italian Job'' (1969) as Mr. Bridger

Notes, references and sources

Notes

References

Sources

 
 
 
 
 

Stage and screen
Male actor filmographies
British filmographies